Meghan Small (born May 25, 1998) is an American competitive swimmer. She won the silver medal in the women's 200 metre individual medley event and the bronze medal in the women's 200 metre butterfly event at the 2019 Pan American Games held in Lima, Peru.

In 2014, she won the bronze medal in the girls' 200 metre individual medley at the Summer Youth Olympics held in Nanjing, China.

References

External links
 
 
 Meghan Small at the 2019 Pan American Games

1998 births
Living people
Place of birth missing (living people)
American female breaststroke swimmers
American female butterfly swimmers
American female freestyle swimmers
Swimmers at the 2014 Summer Youth Olympics
Pan American Games silver medalists for the United States
Pan American Games bronze medalists for the United States
Pan American Games medalists in swimming
Swimmers at the 2015 Pan American Games
Swimmers at the 2019 Pan American Games
Medalists at the 2015 Pan American Games
Medalists at the 2019 Pan American Games
Tennessee Volunteers women's swimmers